Blackstratblues is a solo project of Warren Mendonsa, who is a guitarist, composer and record producer currently based primarily out of Mumbai. All of his music under the moniker of Blackstratblues is self-released. The early albums released under the moniker of Blackstratblues were mostly solo efforts. While, the recent albums have been more of a group effort. He was the lead guitarist of the cult Indian rock band Zero in mid-00s.

He is the nephew of Indian musician and celebrated Bollywood composer Loy Mendonsa of Shankar–Ehsaan–Loy fame.

Biography and playing history

Early years: late 1990s
After picking up the guitar at the age of 5, Mendonsa went on to play rhythm guitar in a few local bands with friends Siddharth Coutto (drums) and Girish 'Bobby' Talwar (rhythm guitar, bass). Sometime around 1997–98, they formed Zero, with Rajeev Talwar on vocals.

With Zero: 1998–2005
Over the years, Zero grew to enjoy nationwide popularity in India. With Warren, Zero released two albums and an EP - Albummed (1999), Hook EP (2002), & Procrastination (2005).

Besides his work in Zero, Warren Mendonsa recorded & released numerous instrumentals - the most popular works being Christmas in July, Spitleaf, & Evil- which enjoyed some fame on online music forums like Gigpad, & Harmony Central. He was also involved in many online collaborations with musicians - most notably Adam Martin, Ed DeGenaro and Zorran Mendonsa - which resulted in a few songs. In late 2004, Mendonsa moved to Auckland, New Zealand, thereby quitting Zero.

During this period, he was also a highly sought-after recording engineer and session guitarist in Bombay, having worked on various film soundtracks, advertising jingles, & other albums.

2005-2007
After moving to Auckland, Warren Mendonsa began to work on solo instrumental material. While visiting India, he reunited with Zero for a few gigs, most notably at the Great Indian Rock Festival 2006.

Nights in Shining Karma
Blackstratblues' debut album, Nights in Shining Karma, was released on 18 April 2007 as a free digital-only download.

The album garnered significant appreciation and popularity on online music forums.

Musical influences and playing style
Warren is heavily influenced by the music of bands such as the Beatles, Queen, Eagles, Gary Moore, etc., largely blues and classic rock oriented, and typically uses Stratocasters. Most often, he uses a black stratocaster which led to the moniker "Blackstratblues". Mendonsa is known for his instantly recognisable, distinctive guitar sound and playing, incorporating immaculate phrasing and abandoning traditional, flashy "guitar hero" techniques, in favour of composing memorable melodies and playing with feel.

Personnel 
The current lineup of the band is:
Warren Mendonsa – guitars
Jai Row Kavi – drums
Adi Mistry – bass
Beven Fonseca – keys

Discography

As Blackstratblues
 Nights in Shining Karma (April 2007)
 The New Album (December 2009)
 The Universe has a Strange Sense of Humour  (March 2015)
 The Last Analog Generation  (August 2017)
 When It's Time (September 2019)
 Hindsight is 2020 (September 2021)

With Zero

Notes and references

Further reading
 Interview, Gigpad, 2004-08-30
 Nights In Shining Karma Review, Split Magazine, 2007-05-07
 Nights In Shining Karma Review, Riff Cafe, 2007-05-17
 Interview, Hypnos Reviews, 2003
 Procrastination Review, Split Magazine, 2007-12-04
 The New Album Review, JAM Magazine, 2009
 The New Album Review, Meteorikonline, 2009
 Chordvine Interview, Chordvine, 2010
 Split Magazine Interview, Split Magazine, 2009

External links
 Official site
 Soundcloud
 Myspace
 Soundclick
 Last.fm
 Downloads

Indian guitarists
New Zealand guitarists
New Zealand male guitarists
Blues rock musicians
1979 births
Living people
21st-century guitarists
21st-century male musicians